Dashzevgiin Namjilmaa (born 25 May 1944) is a Mongolian athlete. She competed in the women's discus throw at the 1964 Summer Olympics and the 1968 Summer Olympics.

References

1944 births
Living people
Athletes (track and field) at the 1964 Summer Olympics
Athletes (track and field) at the 1968 Summer Olympics
Mongolian female discus throwers
Olympic athletes of Mongolia
Place of birth missing (living people)
Asian Games medalists in athletics (track and field)
Asian Games silver medalists for Mongolia
Athletes (track and field) at the 1974 Asian Games
Medalists at the 1974 Asian Games